Alexandra Sourla (born 15 January 1973) is a Greek equestrian. She competed in the individual dressage event at the 2004 Summer Olympics.

References

External links
 

1973 births
Living people
Greek female equestrians
Greek dressage riders
Olympic equestrians of Greece
Equestrians at the 2004 Summer Olympics
Sportspeople from Athens